The Eustace Bros. is a British television drama series, created and principally written by Ashley Pharoah, that first broadcast on BBC One on 2 July 2002. Originally titled Paradise Heights, the series follows the exploits of the Eustace Brothers, Charlie (Neil Morrissey), Clive (Charles Dale) and Richard (Ralf Little), who run a discount warehouse business in Nottingham. Struggling to keep their business afloat, the brothers turn to a local big-shot, Jack Edwards (David Troughton) for help, but find themselves carrying out more and more extreme tasks in order to pay off their debt.

The decision to re-title the series was made following the cliffhanger ending of the first series, in which the Paradise Heights warehouse is burnt to the ground. For the second series, new characters Melissa Garvey (Beth Goddard) and Sam Eustace (Matthew Beard) were added to the cast. Two series of six episodes were broadcast, with the final episode broadcasting on 19 August 2003. The decision to axe the series was made shortly after the second series premiere, which attracted just four million viewers.

Neither series have been released on DVD. As part of the BBC Writer's Room project, the shooting script for the first episode of Paradise Heights is available to download from the Writer's Room website.

Cast
 Neil Morrissey as Charlie Eustace 
 Charles Dale as Clive Eustace 
 Ralf Little as Richard Eustace 
 Nigel Betts as Eddie Aspen 
 Lee Oakes as Davey Robinson

Paradise Heights
 Joanne Froggatt as Julia Sawyer 
 Pam Ferris as Marion Eustace 
 David Troughton as Jack Edwards 
 Rupert Evans as Toby Edwards
 Lindsey Coulson as Claire Eustace 
 Bruce Byron as Terry Hennessy 
 Marcia Mantack as Angie James
 Mary Tamm as Yvonne Edwards 
 Nicky Ladanowski as Mandy Cutler 
 Danielle Brown as Kylie James 
 Michael Hadley as D.I. Hannington 
 Nicholas Harvey as Sam Eustace

The Eustace Bros.
 Beth Goddard as Melissa Garvey 
 Matthew Beard as Sam Eustace

Episodes

Series 1: Paradise Heights (2002)

Series 2: The Eustace Bros. (2003)

References

External links

BBC television dramas
2000s British drama television series
2002 British television series debuts
2003 British television series endings
English-language television shows